The 2001 Euro Formula 3000 Championship was contested over 8 rounds. 11 different teams, 30 different drivers competed. All teams raced with Lola T96/50 chassis with Zytek engines. Future Formula One driver Felipe Massa took the title.

Entries

Calendar

Calendar

Championships standings

† — Drivers did not finish the race, but were classified as they completed over 90% of the race distance.

See also
2001 International Formula 3000 season

References

External links
Official Euroseries 3000 site

Euro Formula 3000
Auto GP
Euro Formula 3000